SSP is a British multinational contract foodservice company, with headquarters in London, England. It operates more than 2,800 branded catering and retail units at over 180 airports and 300 railway stations across 35 countries as a concessionaire. It is listed on the London Stock Exchange and is a constituent of the FTSE 250 Index.

History
The business was established as a division of Scandinavian airline SAS Group under the name of SAS Catering in 1961. Its Select Service Partner (SSP) division was acquired by Compass Group in May 1993 for £72 million. Compass then merged SSP with several other companies it owned, including Travellers Fare, British Rail's former catering division which had been privatised under a management buy-out in 1988 before being bought by Compass in 1992. In 2006 the business was bought by EQT Partners for £1.822 billion. The company was the subject of an initial public offering in 2014.

During the COVID-19 pandemic in the United Kingdom, SSP announced it was cutting 5,000 UK jobs across its chains, including Upper Crust and Caffè Ritazza, as part of a restructuring aimed at keeping the company afloat. In November 2022 it was announced that SSP was buying AMT Coffee out of administration.

Operations

SSP operates a large portfolio of small brands, many of which are locally specific. Significant brands include:

Le Grand Comptoir
Upper Crust
Caffè Ritazza
Starbucks
Burger King
YO! Sushi
Le Train Bleu
Walter
Millies Cookies
Whistlestop

SSP also provides outsourced catering on board a number of train services, operating under the brand RG (previously Rail Gourmet). Clients have included Abellio Greater Anglia, Arriva Trains Wales, Chiltern Railways, DB Schenker, East Coast, East Midlands Trains, Eurostar, Great Western Railway, South Western Railway, Gatwick Express, Hull Trains, Iarnród Éireann, National Railway Company of Belgium, Norwegian State Railways, First ScotRail, Thalys and VR.

SSP provides services at Ottawa International Airport.

Criticism 
In 2018, SSP brand Rail Gourmet was criticised for giving staff four days' notice that they were being made redundant on the Thameslink Railway routes.

References

External links
 Official site

 
Catering and food service companies of the United Kingdom
Food and drink companies established in 1961
Companies listed on the London Stock Exchange
Swedish companies established in 1961
British companies established in 1961